The Complete Hit Singles is a compilation album by Three Dog Night. It was released on May 25, 2004 by Geffen Records.

While eight of these titles landed on the Billboard Adult contemporary chart when originally released, all twenty-one hit the Hot 100. Peaking at No. 1 on the Hot 100 were "Joy to the World," "Mama Told Me (Not to Come)" and "Black and White." On the Adult contemporary charts, the No. 1s were "Black & White" and "An Old Fashioned Love Song." To date this is the only compilation to contain all of the band's top 40 hits. There were eleven top 10s, seven of them reaching gold status. Three Dog Night disbanded in 1977.

Critical reception

Tim Sendra of AllMusic writes, "the songs collected here play like the soundtrack to the '70s" and "these songs are about as good as early-'70s pop gets."

Track listing

Musicians

Three Dog Night

Cory Wells – Vocals
Chuck Negron – Vocals
Danny Hutton – Vocals
Michael Allsup – Guitars
Jimmy Greenspoon – Keyboards
Floyd Sneed – Drums, Percussion
Skip Konte – Keyboards (1974-1976)
Jack Ryland – Bass (1973-1975)
Joe Schermie – Bass (1968-1973)

Additional musicians

"Celebrate"
Walter Parazaider – Saxophone
James Pankow – Trombone
Lee Loughnane – Trumpet

"Never Been To Spain"
Rusty Young - pedal steel

"Pieces Of April"
Patrick Sullivan – Cello

"Let Me Serenade You"
Gordon DeWitty – Organ

"Til The World Ends"
Jimmy Haskell – Strings Arranged By
Ron Stockert – Electric Piano (Fender Rhodes)
Mickey McMeel – Percussion

Production

Mastered by Erick Labson
Producer – Gabriel Mekler (tracks 1 to 5)
Producer – Jimmy Ienner (tracks 18 to 21)
Producer – Richard Podolor (tracks 6 to 17)
Art Direction – Vartan Kurjian
Compilation Producer – Mike Ragogna
Production Design – Glenn Barry
Engineer – Bill Cooper (tracks 1 to 17)
Engineer – Richard Podolor (tracks 1 to 5)
Product Manager – Adam Starr
Product Manager – Kelly Martinez
Production Manager – Adam Abrams

Track information and credits adapted from AllMusic, and verified from the album's liner notes.

Charts

References

External links
Three Dog Night Official Site
Geffen Records Official Site

2004 compilation albums
Three Dog Night compilation albums